= Extremely Decent =

Extremely Decent is a sketch comedy group from Los Angeles, California. They are known for their YouTube channel, where they post sketches and music videos. Popular uploads include The First Honest Cable Company, A Facebook Update in Real Life, and Gollum vs. Smeagol Rap Battle.

The group is made up of Mikey Caro, Jon Eidson, Ian McQuown, Brendan Rice, and Nick Smith.
